Wang Ling (172—15 June 251), courtesy name Yanyun, was a Chinese military general and politician of the state of Cao Wei during the Three Kingdoms period of China.

Early life and career
Wang Ling's family fled to the countryside after his uncle, Wang Yun, was executed in 192 for fomenting Lü Bu's assassination of Dong Zhuo. Later he was declared xiaolian, a crucial nomination to be considered for civil service appointments, and became the Administrator of Zhongshan Commandery. His excellent public service was noticed by chancellor Cao Cao, who moved him into his office.

Service in Cao Wei
In Cao Cao's army, Wang Ling engaged in several battles with Eastern Wu. As the Inspector of Yan Province, he attacked Sun Quan under Zhang Liao. His victory led to his promotion to General Who Builds Loyalty. In another battle against Eastern Wu, he rescued the besieged general Cao Xiu. He was promoted to General of Chariots and Cavalry after a major victory against Quan Cong.

Rebellion

In the second year of Cao Fang's reign, Wang Ling was appointed Minister of Works, while his nephew Linghu Yu became the Inspector of Yan Province. Wang Ling lost faith in Cao Fang's ability to rule after Sima Yi's coup d'etat in the incident at Gaoping Tombs succeeded in turning the emperor against Sima Yi's rival, Cao Shuang. As a result, Wang Ling conspired to replace emperor Cao Fang with his uncle Cao Biao. The conspiracy suffered a setback, however, when Linghu Yu died of an illness. The plot was discovered and Sima Yi led an army to Wang before he could prepare himself for a defense. After Wang Ling surrendered to Sima Yi with the promise of a pardon, he was forced to commit suicide, and his family members and associates were condemned to family annihilation.

See also
 Lists of people of the Three Kingdoms

Notes

References

 Chen, Shou (3rd century). Records of the Three Kingdoms (Sanguozhi).
 Pei, Songzhi (5th century). Annotations to Records of the Three Kingdoms (Sanguozhi zhu).
 Sima, Guang (1084). Zizhi Tongjian.

Year of birth unknown
251 deaths
Cao Wei generals
Cao Wei politicians
Drug-related suicides in China
Generals under Cao Cao
Han dynasty politicians
Political office-holders in Anhui
Political office-holders in Hebei
Political office-holders in Henan
Political office-holders in Shandong
Suicides by poison
Suicides in Cao Wei
Three Rebellions in Shouchun